T-ara Great China Tour  was South Korean girl group T-ara's 5th tour and its first in China. The tour started in Shanghai on and ended in the same city on November 25, 2014. It became the most attended tour by a foreign girl group in the country of all time. The last stop on the tour in Shanghai holds the recordsfor the most-attended concert in China by a Korean group tie with BigBang.

Background and development 
On December 29, 2014, T-ara held their "T-ara China Tour - Shanghai Greting Concert" initiating their tour promotion in China. The concert was attended by Chinese billionaire businessman Wang Sicong who later offered T-ara a multi-million Dollar contract to join his newly established label Banana Plans. NetEase News reported that more than 3,000 people attended the concert.

The "T-ara Great China Tour 2015–16" kicked off in Hefei and concluded in Shanghai in September 2016. It marked T-ara's first concerts in Hefei and Nanjing. On May 20, several music officials announced that T-ara would embark on their first official tour in China in June 2015. On June 20, T-ara attended the press conference for the tour in Nanjing at Nanjing's Sofitel Galaxy Hotel.

On July 10, 2015, T-ara held a press conference to promote their Beijing concert. T-ara announced that they didn't invite any guests to the event to enjoy a personal time with their fans. 

Pre-sale for the last stop on the tour in Shangai was opened on August 17. MBK Entertainment announced that new songs will be performed in the final concert. According to China Daily, the concert had a high production cost, several production teams from Hong Kong and Taiwan were invited to create the stage effects, and made a special trip to help out with professional directors from Korea. The concert also would be held on an extended stage allowing fans to get in close contact with their idols.

Originally T-ara were planned to perform in 13 cities, however, due to schedule conflicts, the tour was reduced to 6 shows only.

Concert synopsis 
The shows on the "T-ara Great China Tour" featured a nearly identical set list with the concert beginning mainly by T-ara's hit songs for the first act, followed by 3 solo stages and then a group stage again. The rest of the members would have their solo stages afterward followed by a last group performance and an encore. The first concert in Shanghai had a different setlist.

T-ara continued with their standard formula for setlists of tour concerts, each member had her own solo stage, members who didn't officially debut as solo performed covers of other artists' songs.

No new songs were performed on the final stop in Shanghai like it was previously announced by MBK Entertainment, however, some songs were performed for the first time including For You (Acoustic version with 6 members) and Hurt.

Commercial performance 
With the last performance of the tour held on September 17, 2016, "T-ara Great China Tour" became the most attended tour by a foreign girl group in China with over 24,000  reported attendees (4 shows only). Additionnally, seats in all in six concerts were reportedly sold-out.

The Shanghai show attracted about 12,000 people, making it one of the largest in the country for a Korean group. The concert also recorded nearly 2M live viewers; a first for a Korean artist.

Setlists 
This set list is from the concert on September 17, 2016, in Shangai, It is not intended to represent all shows from the tour.

Tour dates

Home Media 
Rights to all the tour's shows (except the November 25, 2014 show) were sold to Chinese online streaming services Douyan and Panda TV.

The last two stop on the tour in Guangzhou and Shanghai respectively were edited into DVDs by BANANA Project and were sold in China and Malaysia.

References 
T-ara concert tours
Concert tours of China
2014 concert tours
2015 concert tours
2016 concert tours

